Sebastià Juan Arbó (1902–1984) was a Spanish novelist and playwright. He wrote in Catalan and Spanish. He was born in Sant Carles de la Ràpita on 28 October 1902 and died in Barcelona on 2 January 1984. His work includes novels, drama, biographies and translations. He was an honorary member of the Association of Writers in the Catalan Language. In 1948 he won the Premio Nadal (the Nadal Prize).

Early life
Born into a peasant family, at age eight Juan moved with his parents to Amposta, and at twelve and worked in an office. In 1927 he went to Barcelona, where he began his writing career as a journalist for La Vanguardia and ABC, as well as on various editorials.

Career
In 1931 Juan published his first novel, L'inútil combat (Useless battle).

In 1932 he published Terres de l'Ebre, his best known work, a novel that describes the situation of the peasants of the Ebro delta, forgotten and humble, working in a hard and thankless land, subject to the fatalities. The novel transforms their personal and community experiences into fiction. In 1933 he published Notes d'un estudiant que va morir boig and in 1935 Boig Camins de nit.

After the Civil War he stopped publishing until, in 1947, he released Tino Costa, with versions in Catalan and Spanish. In 1946 he had, however, published, a biography: Cervantes.

From 1948 he wrote works in Spanish such as Sobre las piedras grises (1948) which won the Nadal Prize for novel, and especially Martin Masks (1959). In his later years he returned to publishing in Catalan: Narracions d'Delta (1965), L'espera (1948) and La Masia (1975).

Juan died on 2 January 1984 of a heart attack.

Works

Novels
L'inútil combat. Badalona: Proa, 1931 (Barcelona: Proa, 1969). – The futile battle
Notes d'un estudiant que va morir boig, 1933. (Work was rewritten with the title Hores en blanc. It was published in Spanish with the title The black hour in 1955). – Notes of a student who died insane
Camins de nit. Badalona: Proa, 1935 (Barcelona: Edicions 62, 1987). – Roads at night
Hores en blanc. Barcelona: Llibreria Catalònia, 1935 (Barcelona: Laia, 1983; Barcelona: Edicions 62, 1991). – Hours in white
La ciutat maleïda. Barcelona: Llibreria Catalònia, 1935. – Lands of the Ebro
Terres de l'Ebre. Barcelona: Llibreria Catalònia, 1936 (Barcelona: Selecta, 1955; Barcelona: Edicions 62, 1980). (Work translated into Italian, French, German and Dutch)
Tino Costa. Barcelona: Àncora, 1947.
Sobre las piedras grises. Barcelona: Destino, 1949; Barcelona: Destino, 1973 (5ª ed). – On Gray Stones
Verdaguer: el poeta, el sacerdot i el món. Barcelona: Aedos, 1952. – Verdaguer: poet, priest and the world
Martín de Caretas. 1955-1959 – Martin of Caretas
Los hombres de la tierra y el mar. Barcelona: Llibreria Editorial Argos, 1961. (1965 ??) – Men of the land and sea
L'hora negra seguit de Divertiments: la nit de Sant Joan. Barcelona: Selecta, 1961. – The time followed by black entertainments: the night of San Juan
Narracions del Delta. Barcelona: Selecta, 1965 – Stories of the Delta
Obra catalana completa, I. Novel.les de l'Ebre. Barcelona: Edicions 62, 1966. – Complete Catalan Works 1  Novels of the Ebro
L'espera. Barcelona: Club Editor, 1968 (1965?) – The waiting
Obras selectas. Barcelona: AHR, 1973 – Select works
La Masia. Barcelona: Selecta, 1975 (Barcelona: Orbis, 1984) – The Farmhouse
La tempestad. Espluguas de Llobregat: Plaza & Janés, 1978. – The Tempest
El segundo del Apocalipsis. Espluguas de Llobregat: Plaza & Janés, 1981 – The second of the Apocalypse
Memorias: los hombres de la ciudad. Barcelona: Editorial Planeta, 1982. – Memories: Men of the city
Obra catalana completa (edited by Emili Rosales). Barcelona: Columna, 1992–1993 (3 volumes). – Catalan complete work 
Viatge a l'Ebre. Barcelona: Columna-Tresmall, 1997. – Journey to the Ebro

Theatre
La ciutat maleïda. Barcelona: Llibreria Catalònia, 1935 – The damn city
Despertar. 1936 – Awakening
Nausica. Barcelona: La Rosa dels Vents, 1937.

Biographies
La vida trágica de Mosèn Jacinto Verdaguer. 1951 Barcelona: Planeta/Aedos, 1970 – The tragic life of Mosen Jacinto Verdaguer
Pío Baroja y su tiempo. Barcelona: Planeta, 1969. – Pio Baroja and his time
Cervantes (hombre y época). Barcelona: 1948; Barcelona: Planeta, 1971. – Cervantes (Man and era)

Awards
Fastenrath, Floral Games of Barcelona 1934. For the work Terres de l'Ebre.
Novelistas Award, Municipality of Barcelona, 1936. For the work Camins de nit.
Nadal Prize, 1948. For the work Sobre las piedras grises.

External links
 Webpage devoted to Sebastià Juan Arbó at LletrA (UOC), Catalan Literature Online (Catalan)

1902 births
1984 deaths
Catalan-language writers
Catalan dramatists and playwrights
Writers from Catalonia
20th-century Spanish dramatists and playwrights
Spanish male dramatists and playwrights
20th-century Spanish male writers